Summer is an 1893 painting by the Flemish painter Emile Claus, now in the Royal Museum of Fine Arts, Antwerp.

External links

1893 paintings
Paintings in the collection of the Royal Museum of Fine Arts Antwerp